Bennett, British Columbia, Canada, is an abandoned town next to Bennett Lake and along Lindeman Creek (formerly known as the One Mile River). The townsite is now part of the Chilkoot Trail National Historic Site of Canada and is managed by Parks Canada.  Bennett is also a stop on the White Pass and Yukon Route railroad during the summer months.

History

Bennett was built during the Klondike Gold Rush of 1897–1899 at the end of the White Pass and Chilkoot Trails from the nearby ports of Skagway and Dyea in Alaska. Gold prospectors would pack their supplies over the Coast Mountains from the ports and then build or purchase rafts to take them down the Yukon River to the gold fields around Dawson City, Yukon. When the White Pass and Yukon Route Railroad was completed in 1900 it went right to Whitehorse, passing the town. This led the entire economy of Bennett, based on stampeders and river travelers, to collapse.

One of the establishments in Bennett was the Arctic Hotel, a combination saloon, restaurant, and hotel set up by Friedrich "Fred" Trump (grandfather of Donald Trump) and Ernest Levin. The establishment included a brothel, a portrayal that Donald Trump said was "totally false".

References

External links

Klondike Gold Rush
Ghost towns in British Columbia
Atlin District
1897 establishments in British Columbia
Populated places established in 1897
1900 disestablishments in British Columbia